Senator Coffin may refer to:

Alexander J. Coffin (1794–1868), New York State Senate
Bob Coffin (born 1942), Nevada State Senate
Charles Edward Coffin (1841–1912), Maryland State Senate
Owen Vincent Coffin (1836–1921), Connecticut State Senate
Peleg Coffin Jr. (1756–1805), Massachusetts State Senate